The Frederick Crouse House is a historic house located at 3960 Altamont-Voorheesville Road in Guilderland, Albany County, New York.

Description and history 
The original stone Dutch house was built in about 1760. The house was expanded around 1780, then the main house was built in 1802.  It is a substantial Federal style farmhouse and one of the oldest structures in Guilderland.

It was listed on the National Register of Historic Places on November 10, 1982.

References

Houses on the National Register of Historic Places in New York (state)
Federal architecture in New York (state)
Houses completed in 1760
Houses in Albany County, New York
National Register of Historic Places in Albany County, New York